Jenifer Rice-Genzuk Henry, born as Jenifer Sara Rice-Genzuk and previously known as Jeni G., is an American screenwriter and former singer.  She is currently working as Executive Producer and co-showrunner on the Freeform series Grown-ish. Before her time as a screenwriter, she was a member of the American girl group Before Dark. She also served as a staff writer on MTV's Death Valley, an executive producer on BET's The Game and as a co-executive producer on the ABC series Black-ish .

Education
In 2001, Rice-Genzuk Henry graduated from USC University of Southern California with a B.S. in Music Industry.

Discography (with Before Dark)

Album
2000: Daydreamin'

Singles

Filmography

The Game episodes
 "To Baby... Or Not To Baby" (2007)
 "Je-Rome Wasn't Built In A Day" (2008)
 "Take These Vows And Shove 'Em!" (2008)
 "The Platski Thickens" (2008)
 "Hill Street Blues" (2009)
 "A Very Special Episode" (2011)
 "Whip It, Whip It Good" (2011)
 "Keep Your Friends Close And Your Prostitute Closer" (2012)
 "A Punch In The Gut... Full Of Human" (2012)
 "Let Them Eat (Cup)Cake!" (2012)
 "Cold Swine Sucks... And So Does Falling In Love!" (2012)
 "How To Lose All Your Phat In One Day" (2013)
 "I Love Luke... Ahh!" (2013)
 "A Swan Song For Rick And Tasha" (2013)
 "He's A No-Good, Lyin', Cheatin', Honky-Tonk Man!" (2014)
 "The Pittsy Shuffle: Why Pitts Really Dripped" (2015)
 "Acting Class And Rebound Ass" (2015)
 "Hashtag My Bad" (2015)
 "Clip It... Clip It Good" (2015)

Death Valley episodes 
 "Who, What, When, Werewolf... Why?" (2011)

Black-ish episodes 
 "Jacked o' Lantern" (2015)
 "Good-ish Times" (2016)
 "Being Bow-Racial" (2016)
 "ToysRn'tUs" (2017)
 "Dog Eat Dog World" (2018)

Grown-ish episodes 
 "Late Registration" (2018)
 "It's Hard Out There For A Pimp" (2018)
 "Crew Love" (2018)
 "Face the World" (2019)
 "Strictly 4 My..." (2019)
 "Dreams and Nightmares" (2019)
 "Age Ain't Nothing But A Number" (2020)
 "Know Yourself" (2021)
 "Who Do You Love?" (2021)
 "A BOY IS A GUN" (2021)
 "You Beat Me to the Punch" (2021)

References

External links 
 

Living people
21st-century American women writers
African-American television producers
African-American screenwriters
American television producers
American women television producers
American television writers
American women screenwriters
American contemporary R&B singers
University of Southern California alumni
USC Thornton School of Music alumni
1978 births
American women film producers
21st-century American singers
21st-century American women singers
American women television writers
21st-century American screenwriters
20th-century African-American women singers
21st-century African-American women writers
21st-century African-American writers